Edmund Trzcinski (2 January 1921 – 3 June 1996) was an American playwright, best known for the play Stalag 17.

He was born in the Bronx, New York City, New York. An enlisted member of the 8th Air Force, his airplane was shot down over Germany and he was sent to Luft Stalag 17B.

His most notable work is the Broadway play Stalag 17, adapted into a movie in 1953,  which he co-wrote with Donald Bevan, a fellow POW in Germany. He also had a brief role in the film as the POW whose wife claims to have found a baby on her doorstep which looks just like her. He repeatedly says, "I believe it," in an attempt to convince himself that his wife hasn't been unfaithful.

He died in Manhattan in 1996, aged 75.

Filmography

External links
Edmund Trzcinski at findagrave
 https://www.findagrave.com/memorial/135447976/edmund-trzcinski

1921 births
1996 deaths
People from the Bronx
United States Army Air Forces personnel of World War II
20th-century American dramatists and playwrights
United States Army Air Forces soldiers
American prisoners of war in World War II
World War II prisoners of war held by Germany
Members of The Lambs Club